Richard Devon (born Richard Gibson Ferraiole, December 11, 1926 – February 26, 2010) was an American character actor and voice actor who between the late 1940s and 1991 performed in hundreds of roles on stage, radio, television, and in feature films.

Early life
Devon was born in Glendale, California in 1926, the only son of four children of Florence H. (née Glass) and Luca Ferraiole. His father, a native of Italy, immigrated to the United States in 1901 and lived in Pennsylvania before moving to California, where by 1930 he was employed as a waiter in a Los Angeles cafe. To supplement his family's modest income, Devon later worked part-time as a stable boy and then as a riding instructor at an equestrian academy in Griffith Park. That early experience with horses proved useful in his acting career, especially in Western films and television series. Following his graduation from high school, Devon worked as a mail carrier at Monogram Pictures, a laborer at a plant nursery, a mechanic's helper, and as a doorman at the Hollywood Palladium.

Career

In the 1950s Devon began performing as a character actor in many Four Star Television series, although his work was not limited to a single  production company or network. He appears, for example, as Ed Pike in the 1959 episode "Yellow Fever" of the Western series Colt .45, which was produced by Warner Bros. and originally broadcast by ABC.

Devon's television credits include Richard Diamond, Private Detective (three episodes), Tales of Wells Fargo, The Life and Legend of Wyatt Earp, Johnny Ringo (in the episode "The Posse").

He guest-starred on several episodes of The Rifleman from 1959 to 1962: "Blood Brother" as Jethroe, "The Spiked Rifle" as Stark, "The Grasshopper" as Ryerson, "The Silent Knife" as Macowan, "Miss MIlly" as Adams, "The Stand-In" as Potter and "The Most Amazing Man" as Lovett. 

Devon appeared on Space Patrol,  Trackdown starring Robert Culp (three episodes, including the pilot episode of that series, "Badge of Honor," which aired initially on Dick Powell's Zane Grey Theatre), The Tall Man, Gunsmoke (in the episodes "Ex-Con" and "The Quest for Asa Janin"), Highway Patrol as a hitchhiker, The Rebel, The Virginian (as Haskell in the 1970 episode "You Can Lead a Horse to Water") and its spin-off.

He guest-starred on Bonanza (four episodes from 1960-1967: "The Avenger", "The Trail Gang", "The Scapegoat" and "A Bride for Buford"), Laredo, Daniel Boone, The Monkees, Lassie, The Twilight Zone episode "Dead Man's Shoes" in 1962, three episodes of Perry Mason from 1964–1966, and Mission: Impossible. 

Devon had a regular role as well as on the CBS series Yancy Derringer, performing the part of Jody Barker, a pickpocket and sometime cohort of the lead character played by Jock Mahoney.  He also played the role of Cole Striker, a crook, in the 1963 episode "Incident of the Buryin' Man" on CBS's Rawhide.

He provided the voice of Batman on episodes of the radio version of The Adventures of Superman.

Devon's big screen career consists of at least two dozen feature films. Some of those productions are The Undead, War of the Satellites, The Three Stooges Go Around the World in a Daze, The Comancheros, and the Battle of Blood Island.

Personal life and death
In December 1959 Devon married Patricia A. Riopelle. They remained together for over 50 years, until Devon died of vascular disease in Mill Valley, California in 2010.

Filmography

References and notes

External links

 
 Richard Devon at Rifleman fansite

1926 births
2010 deaths
American male film actors
American male television actors
Western (genre) television actors
American people of Italian descent